Bugala Island, in Uganda, is the tenth-largest lake island in the world. It is a part of the Ssese Islands in the Kalangala District. The chief town is Kalangala.

References

Kalangala District
Lake islands of Uganda
Islands of Lake Victoria